Switzerland competed at the 1952 Winter Olympics in Oslo, Norway.

Medalists

Alpine skiing

Men

Women

Bobsleigh

Cross-country skiing

Men

Men's 4 × 10 km relay

Figure skating

Men

Women

Pairs

Ice hockey

The tournament was run in a round-robin format with nine teams participating.

Switzerland 12-0 Finland
Switzerland 6-3 Poland
Norway 2-7 Switzerland
USA 8-2 Switzerland
Canada 11-2 Switzerland
Czechoslovakia 8-3 Switzerland
Sweden 5-2 Switzerland
Switzerland 6-3 Germany FR

Nordic combined 

Events:
 18 km cross-country skiing
 normal hill ski jumping

The cross-country skiing part of this event was combined with the main medal event, meaning that athletes competing here were skiing for two disciplines at the same time. Details can be found above in this article, in the cross-country skiing section.

The ski jumping (normal hill) event was held separate from the main medal event of ski jumping, results can be found in the table below (athletes were allowed to perform three jumps, the best two jumps were counted and are shown here).

Ski jumping

References

 Olympic Winter Games 1952, full results by sports-reference.com

Nations at the 1952 Winter Olympics
1952
Olympics